Arif Zaman is a Pakistani mathematician, academic scientist, and a retired professor of Statistics and Mathematics from Syed Babar Ali School of Science and Engineering, Lahore University of Management Sciences (LUMS), Lahore, Pakistan. Before joining LUMS in 1994, he also served in the Statistics Department at Purdue University and at Florida State University.

Zaman attended Harvey Mudd College, where he completed his B.S. in Mathematics in 1976. He received an M.A. in Applied Mathematics in 1977 at the Claremont Graduate School, and his PhD in Statistics at Stanford University in 1981. In his doctoral thesis, he studied de Finetti's theorem and its possible turn out in Markov chain. His dissertation was supervised by Persi Diaconis.

Works
Arif Zaman (1984), "An Approximation Theorem for Finite Markov Exchangeability", Annals of Applied Probability, volume 4, page 223–229.
"Random Binary Matrices in Bio-ecological Ecology - Instituting a Good Neighbor Policy", Environmental and Ecological Statistics, 9, No. 4, 405–421, 2002, (with D. Simberloff).

References

External links
 
 

20th-century Pakistani mathematicians
21st-century Pakistani mathematicians
Claremont Graduate University alumni
Florida State University faculty
Harvey Mudd College alumni
Academic staff of Lahore University of Management Sciences
Living people
Pakistani statisticians
Purdue University faculty
Stanford University alumni
Year of birth missing (living people)